Rob Hawthorne is an English football commentator, currently working for Sky Sports. He is notable for his commentating alongside Andy Gray in the 2005 UEFA Champions League Final in Istanbul.

He was born in Dudley, Worcestershire now West Midlands. He was a pupil at Foxyards Primary School and later the Blue Coat School.

Early career
His media career began at the age of 14, when he was still a pupil at the Blue Coat School. After participating in a local radio talent spotting competition, he was taken on by Beacon Radio in Wolverhampton.

Rob also appeared and presented quite regularly on Dudley and District Hospital Broadcasting (DDHB) from the Guest, Burton Road, and Russell Hall hospitals in the Black Country area of Dudley

Five Live
He became one of the regular commentators on live broadcasts for BBC Radio 5, shortly after its launch, before moving on to BBC Radio Five Live with the rest of its sports team in 1994. After senior commentators Mike Ingham and Alan Green, Hawthorne and colleague Ron Jones formed the second "tier" of commentators. During his time on radio Hawthorne commentated on several Division One Play-off finals, the Scottish Cup Final, a number of FA Cup and League Cup semi-finals and two major international tournaments - Euro 92 and World Cup 94.

Television commentary
His first live television experience came in 1991, when he covered Brazilian championship football games for Screensport.

Sky Sports
Hawthorne's move to television was completed as he became part of the Sky Sports commentary team covering Monday night games in the F.A. Premier League; his first live game was Leeds United v Liverpool in August 1995.

But after his first season covering Monday Night Football (having commented on the title showdown between Newcastle and Man United) Hawthorne worked alongside Alan Brazil and commentated on some memorable play off finals such as Charlton v Sunderland from 1998 and Manchester City v Gillingham from 1999. He was moved back to covering Monday Night Football and some Saturday games. He has commentated on League Cup Finals and FA Cup matches. He commentates on all of the Republic of Ireland's matches. In 2003, when Sky gained coverage of Champions League football live, Hawthorne added this tournament to the growing list of tournaments he has commentated on. In 2005, he commentated on the famous Liverpool v AC Milan Champions League Final, as Sky's lead commentator Martin Tyler was covering England. In 2019, Hawthorne commentated over the 2019 EFL Cup Final between Manchester City and Chelsea alongside Alan Smith. Usual commentator Martin Tyler had been commentating the Manchester United-Liverpool clash hours before.

Hawthorne will commentate the 2023 EFL Cup final between Manchester United and Newcastle United, alongside co-commentators Gary Neville and Jamie Carragher.

References

Living people
Year of birth missing (living people)
English association football commentators
People from Dudley